Caladenia longicauda subsp. merrittii, commonly known as Merritt's white spider orchid, is a plant in the orchid family Orchidaceae and is endemic to the south-west of Western Australia. It has a single hairy leaf and up to three large, mainly white flowers with very long, drooping lateral sepals and petals, and a white broad labellum with relatively short labellum teeth. It is one of the largest spider orchids.

Description
There are four or more rows of pale red calli in the centre of the labellum. Flowering occurs from September to October.

Taxonomy and naming
Caladenia longicauda was first formally described by John Lindley in 1840 and the description was published in A Sketch of the Vegetation of the Swan River Colony. In 2001 Stephen Hopper and Andrew Brown described eleven subspecies, including subspecies merrittii and the descriptions were published in Nuytsia. The subspecies name (merrittii) honours an orchid enthusiast, Wayne Merritt, who was one of the first to recognise this orchid as a new subspecies.

Distribution and habitat
Merritt's white spider orchid mainly occurs between Augusta, Margaret River and Nannup in the Jarrah Forest and Warren biogeographic regions where it grows in jarrah forest.

Conservation
Caladenia longicauda subsp. merrittii  is classified as "not threatened" by the Western Australian Government Department of Parks and Wildlife.

References

longicauda subsp. merrittii
Endemic orchids of Australia
Orchids of Western Australia
Plants described in 2001
Taxa named by Stephen Hopper
Taxa named by Andrew Phillip Brown